Aroostook Airways was an airline based in Presque Isle, Maine, United States, from 1969 to 1972.  It was established as P & M Flying Services, founded by John C. Philbrick in 1965. It offered commuter airline service throughout Maine, Boston, and Hartford's Bradley International Airport. The airline also offered charter and air ambulance service.

Destinations
Maine
Presque Isle (Northern Maine Regional Airport at Presque Isle) (PQI) Hub
Augusta (Augusta State Airport) (AUG)
Bangor (Bangor International Airport) (BGR)
Madawaska/Fort Kent (Northern Aroostook Regional Airport)* (WFK)
Portland (Portland International Jetport) (PWM)
Connecticut
Hartford (Bradley International Airport) (BDL)
Massachusetts
Boston (Logan International Airport) (BOS)
Those airports marked with an asterisk (*) no longer have commercial airline service.

See also 
 List of defunct airlines of the United States

References

External links
AirTimes.com

Defunct airlines of the United States
Transportation in Aroostook County, Maine
Defunct companies based in Maine
Airlines based in Maine
Airlines established in 1969
Airlines disestablished in 1972
1969 establishments in Maine
1972 disestablishments in Maine